Coulonges is a commune in the Vienne department in the Nouvelle-Aquitaine region in western France.

Geography
The river Benaize forms the commune's south-western border.

See also
Communes of the Vienne department

References

Communes of Vienne